The Poet Laureate of Montana is the poet laureate for the U.S. state of Montana. Montana Governor Brian Schweitzer signed Senate Bill 69 into law in 2005, creating the position.

List of Poets Laureate

The following have held the position: 

 Sandra Alcosser (2005-2007)
 Greg Pape (2007-2009)
 Henry Real Bird (2009-2011)
 Sheryl Noethe (2011-2013)
 Tami Haaland (2013-2015)
 Michael Earl Craig (2015-2017)
 Lowell Jaeger (2017-2019)
 Melissa Kwasny and M.L. Smoker (2019-2021)
 Mark Gibbons (2021)

External links
Poets Laureate of Montana at the Library of Congress
Poet Laureate at Montana Arts Council

See also

 Poet laureate
 List of U.S. states' poets laureate
 United States Poet Laureate

References

 
Montana culture
American Poets Laureate